
John Dillon Nugent (22 December 1869 – 1 March 1940) was an Irish nationalist politician, insurance representative and company director. He was born at Keady, County Armagh, the son of grocer John Nugent and Sarah Dillon. He was educated at National Schools there. He married in August 1896 and with his wife Mary, née Nolan, had seven children.

He was the national secretary of the Ancient Order of Hibernians (AOH) from 1904 until his death. Patrick Maume described him as Joseph Devlin's 'right-hand man'.  Marie Coleman in the Dictionary of Irish Biography states that he used the AOH to intimidate the Irish Party's opponents, and that he orchestrated the attacks on William O'Brien at the infamous United Irish League ‘baton convention’ of 1909.

Nugent was a member of Dublin Corporation from 1912 and a Poor Law Guardian from 1908 to 1920.  He was elected as MP for the constituency of Dublin College Green at the by-election of 11 June 1915 following the death of Joseph Nannetti, defeating the Labour candidate Thomas Farren, who stood on a separatist programme, by 2445 votes to 1816. He was defeated at the 1918 general election by Michael Staines of Sinn Féin contesting Dublin St Michan's.

At the 1921 Northern Ireland general election, Nugent was elected as a Nationalist in the Armagh seat. He was defeated at the 1925 general election.  Following this defeat he concentrated on his insurance and other business interests.

References

Publications
 The AOH and its Critics, Dublin, pr. Curtis, 1911

Works
 Dictionary of Irish Biography (online)
 Patrick Maume, The Long Gestation: Irish Nationalist Life 1891–1918, New York, St Martin's Press, 1999
 Brian Walker (ed.), Parliamentary Election Results in Ireland, 1801–1922, Dublin, Royal Irish Academy, 1978

External links 
  Warning: As of June 2011, the listing of Nugent's Parliamentary contributions given by online Hansard on this webpage was severely defective, implying that he only spoke in a single debate.  It will hopefully be corrected in due course.

1869 births
1940 deaths
Members of the House of Commons of Northern Ireland 1921–1925
Nationalist Party (Ireland) members of the House of Commons of Northern Ireland
UK MPs 1910–1918
Members of the Parliament of the United Kingdom for County Dublin constituencies (1801–1922)
People from Keady
Members of the House of Commons of Northern Ireland for County Armagh constituencies